Mandubí is a southern suburb of the city of Rivera in the Rivera Department of northeastern Uruguay.

Geography
To its southeast is Route 5 and the suburb La Pedrera and to its northwest the suburb Santa Teresa.

Population
In 2011 Mandubí had a population of 6,019.
 
Source: Instituto Nacional de Estadística de Uruguay

References

External links
INE map of Rivera, Santa Teresa, Mandubí and Lagunón

Populated places in the Rivera Department